30 North LaSalle is a 553 ft (169m) tall skyscraper in Chicago, Illinois, United States. It was completed in 1975 and has 44 floors. Thomas E. Stanley designed the building, which is the 81st tallest in Chicago. It is built on the site of the Chicago Stock Exchange Building.

Tenants
Telephone and Data Systems

See also
List of tallest buildings in Chicago

References

Skyscraper office buildings in Chicago
Office buildings completed in 1975
Leadership in Energy and Environmental Design gold certified buildings
1975 establishments in Illinois